Russian American Football Championship is the highest level of American football played in Russia, previously known as the League of American Football (LAF; , ЛАФ).

There are 11 teams in two divisions participating in the league. Since 2020 season the Eastern European Super League serves as the highest league of American football in Russia.

History
American football came into the Soviet Union in late 1980s. The first official games were played in 1989 when American high school all-star teams from Oklahoma played exhibition games against local teams, following a failed attempt to have college football bowl game be played in Moscow (known as the Glasnost Bowl). In the same year the very first game between Russian teams was played.

In 1991, the Soviet Championship was founded. The league became the Russian Championship in 1992 as the country collapsed. The league was suspended in the turmoils of the dissolution of the USSR.

The Russian Championship was founded again in 2002. The league has been growing ever since.

In 2016 it was reorganized as The League of American Football, LAF in short. But in 2019 the league was re-organized as Russian Championship.

Since 2020 season the Eastern European Super League serves as the highest league of American football in Russia.

List of Champions

References

National championships in Russia
American football leagues in Europe
Professional sports leagues in Russia